The following is the final results of the 1994 World Wrestling Championships. Men's Freestyle competition were held in Istanbul, Turkey. Men's Greco-Roman competition were held in Tampere, Finland and Women's competition were held in Sofia, Bulgaria.

Medal table

Team ranking

Medal summary

Men's freestyle

Men's Greco-Roman

Women's freestyle

References
UWW Database

World Wrestling Championships
W
W
W
W
Wrestling
World 1994
Sports competitions in Istanbul
International wrestling competitions hosted by Finland
September 1994 sports events in Turkey
1990s in Istanbul
Sports competitions in Tampere
August 1994 sports events in Turkey
1990s in Sofia
Sports competitions in Sofia